Neil Robinson (28 February 1929 – 4 October 2009) was a Church of England priest and Archdeacon of Suffolk from 1987  to 1994.

Robinson was educated at Penistone Grammar School and Durham University; and was ordained in 1954. After a curacy in Hull he was Vicar of South Wigston from 1958 to 1969. After this he was Rector and Rural Dean of Market Bosworth from 1969 to 1983; and a Residentiary Canon at Worcester Cathedral from 1983 until his appointment as Archdeacon.

References

1929 births
2009 deaths
People educated at Penistone Grammar School
Archdeacons of Suffolk
People from Oadby and Wigston (district)
People from Market Bosworth
Alumni of St John's College, Durham